Robert Jozinović (born 7 April 1979) is an Australian film and television actor.

Early life

Born in Mackay Australia, the eldest of four children to his Croatian parents who immigrated to Australia, settling in Moranbah. Completed his secondary education at St Joseph's College Nudgee and holds two bachelor's degrees from the University of Queensland in Philosophy and Neuroscience.

Acting

Early Career 2000–06

Trained for four years at The Actors Workshop, Brisbane, Australia, under acting teacher Lyn Kidd. Filming in Australia constituted much of his formative years as an actor, working on independent short films (award-winning films screened at film festivals worldwide), TV commercials (most notable for the Australian Mitsubishi Pajero advert featuring the song Rush by Big Audio Dynamite, music videos (Australian bands The Superjesus, The Living End, and Silverchair's ARIA nominated clip The Greatest View) and small roles in feature films (Undead directed by Spierig brothers).

Europe 2006–11

After stops in Munich and London, he found his first major television role in Croatia. Jozinović played English speaking roles in three Croatian telenovelas. In the period-piece Ponos Ratkajevih he played Randy, a British World War II pilot downed in Nazi-occupied territory and in Zakon Ljubavi played Will Markovich, an American-born Harvard law graduate (both screening in five countries). In the Croatian telenovela Larin Izbor Jozinović plays South African police officer Inspector Camden (screening in 17 countries).

He played a small role on the German biopic Max Schmeling, by renowned director Uwe Boll.

Jozinović's most notable role in Croatia was the main cast role of Doctor Dražen Ricijaš in the TV series drama Najbolje Godine. He played an Australian general practitioner. Two seasons of 318 episodes were filmed over two years and constantly gained excellent prime-time viewer ratings. The role was in Croatian. As preparation he enrolled for a semester at the University of Zagreb studying Croatian Language. Jozinović's character became quite popular with the viewing public.

Filmography

Notes and references

External links

 
 
 Graduate of The Actors Workshop

1979 births
Living people
Australian male film actors
Australian male television actors
People from Mackay, Queensland
Australian people of Croatian descent